Christine Harper  is a journalist who works as the chief financial correspondent for Bloomberg News. She has worked for the company since 1998 when she joined the London office. She has reported on Wall Street from New York since April 2006, and is noted for her coverage of Goldman Sachs and Morgan Stanley.

She previously worked for Dow Jones Newswires in Brussels and the US, and worked as a correspondent for The Philadelphia Inquirer and as a reporter for Sun Herald newspaper in Biloxi, Mississippi. She has a master's degree in journalism from Northwestern University.

Professional recognition
Harper has received awards from the New York Press Club "Bonuses at Wall Street Big Five Surge to $36 Billion" and the Society of the Silurians  for an article entitled "Broken Securities Industry Still Has $20 Billion to Pay Bonuses".

In 2009, she won a National Headliner Club Award for a four-part series of articles on the fallout from the Lehman Brothers bankruptcy.

In 2011, she won another Society of the Silurians award in the category for Business/Financial Reporting for an article entitled, "How the Banks Won."

Personal life
Born and raised in Manhattan, Harper attended Phillips Exeter Academy. She graduated from Northwestern University in 1991, earning both a bachelor's degree and a master's degree in journalism.

Career timeline
 1991–1992: Reporter, The Sun-Herald in Biloxi, Mississippi
 1993–1994: Correspondent, The Philadelphia Inquirer
 1994–1996: Assistant to the Senior Vice Dean, Columbia Business School
 1996–1997: Reporter at Dow Jones Newswires in Jersey City, New Jersey, covering the currency and Treasury bond markets
 1997–1998: Reporter at Dow Jones Newswires in Brussels, Belgium
 1998–2000: Reporter at Bloomberg News in London covering telecoms, media and technology companies
 2000–2002: Reporter at Bloomberg News in London covering corporate bonds
 2002–2006: Reporter at Bloomberg News in London covering investment banking
 2006–2008: Reporter at Bloomberg News in New York covering Wall Street firms including Goldman Sachs and Morgan Stanley
 2008–present: Chief Financial Correspondent at Bloomberg News in New York

Awards and honors
 New York Press Club Award
 Society of the Silurians Award
 National Headliner Club Award

References

External links
 Christine Harper Profile
 New York Press Club Award
 Society of the Silurians
 National Headliner Club

American business and financial journalists
Living people
Medill School of Journalism alumni
Year of birth missing (living people)